Luke William Offord (born 19 November 1999) is an English professional footballer who plays as a defender or midfielder for League Two side Crewe Alexandra, and is also club captain.

Career
Offord graduated from Crewe's academy in summer 2018. He was given a two-year contract (with an optional two-year extension) in May 2019 having spent time on loan at Witton Albion.

In December 2019, Offord went on a month's loan to Nantwich Town. Soon after his return to Crewe, he made his first team debut, and first Crewe start, playing at centre-half in a 2–0 win over Leyton Orient on 28 January 2020, and then helping the team to win four of their next six games.

He scored his first league goal for Crewe on 10 October 2020, opening the scoring in a 3-0 win against Wigan Athletic at Gresty Road. On 13 November 2020, he signed a new three-year contract with Crewe through to the summer of 2023. After featuring regularly in Crewe's defence, he suffered a serious (grade 3) hamstring injury in a match against Bristol Rovers on 19 January 2021, requiring a prolonged recovery. He returned to first team action in April 2021, but then suffered another hamstring injury requiring a further prolonged lay-off.

In February 2022, Crewe's then manager David Artell said Offord could be a future captain of the club after consistent performances in the Crewe backline, and in July 2022, Artell's successor Alex Morris appointed Offord as captain for the 2022–23 season.

Career statistics

References

Living people
1999 births
English footballers
English Football League players
Northern Premier League players
Association football defenders
Witton Albion F.C. players
Nantwich Town F.C. players
Crewe Alexandra F.C. players